A creeper is a fictional creature from the sandbox video game Minecraft. Creepers are hostile mobs (short for mobile non-player characters) that can be encountered within the game world at any given time or location where such mobs spawn in the dark, such as nighttime. Instead of traditionally attacking the player directly, they creep up on the player and explode when they get close, destroying blocks in the surrounding area and potentially damaging the player if they are inside or near the blast radius. Their green camouflage and generally silent behavior aid in stealth attacks. Creepers were first added to Minecraft in a pre-alpha update to the game that was released on August 31, 2009.

The creeper has become one of the most widely recognized icons of Minecraft. They have been referenced and parodied in popular culture, and they are featured prominently in Minecraft merchandise and advertising.

Characteristics and design 
Creepers were created as a result of a coding error of the pig mob in the pre-alpha stages of Minecraft'''s development. Minecraft creator Markus "Notch" Persson mixed the dimensions of the pig model up, with the length and height being swapped. This, combined with the AI of looking at the player, led to the Creeper becoming a hostile mob. On September 1, 2009, the monster was named "Creeper" and was added to one of the pre-alpha versions of the game called 0.24_SURVIVAL_TEST_03. In 2011, the Minecraft logo was edited to integrate the creeper face into the letter "A". For April Fools' Day 2014, Minecraft was briefly updated to have Creepers and all other mobs and music sound the same as Villagers, voiced by Dan Lloyd.

The original color of the creeper was dark green. In 2021, an investigation revealed that Persson simply took the texture of leaves, one of the building blocks of Minecraft, and painted on it a characteristic face. With the new updates, the hostile mob received a new texture, sound, and unique behavior. Initially, creepers attacked players directly like zombies and exploded only when they were killed, but Persson decided that this was not enough and made the explosion a basic mob attack.

In Minecraft, the player exists in a large world made up of cubes. The world contains a number of enemies, of which creepers are commonly encountered. A creeper is practically silent until it comes near the player, at which point it emits a quiet hiss and detonates after a short delay. The explosion kills the creeper, can kill or injure the player, and also destroys surrounding blocks. In an article for Games and Culture, Daniel Dooghan characterized the creeper as a "suicide bomber".

The charged creeper is a more powerful variant of the regular creeper. Over time, the developers decided that creepers were not unpredictable enough, and increased the destructive power of their explosions by having creepers become charged if a lightning strike occurs near them. Mobs killed by charged creepers, including other creepers, drop their heads, which can then be worn in the player's head armor slot as a disguise against mobs of that type.

 Appearances 
The creeper originally appeared in Minecraft in a pre-alpha update as a common hostile mob that silently approaches players and hisses, then explodes. It appeared later in Minecraft spin-off games such as Minecraft: Story Mode, Minecraft Dungeons, Minecraft Legends and Minecraft Earth.

Outside of Minecraft, it also appeared in Terraria, Torchlight II, Borderlands 2, Octodad: Dadliest Catch, and in Nintendo's crossover fighting game Super Smash Bros. Ultimate, where the creeper has been featured as a Mii Brawler costume.

 Impact 

The creeper is considered to be one of Minecraft's most iconic enemies and icons. The pixelated face of the creeper has been integrated into the "A" of the Minecraft logo, as well as being used in numerous Halloween costumes and cosplays. Guinness World Records Gamer's Edition listed Creeper as tenth in their list of "top 50 video game villains". The creeper has been featured in multiple Lego Minecraft sets and has been the main focus of one. In 2021, PC Gamer ranked Creeper as 9th of "the 50 most iconic characters in PC gaming," stating that "The Creeper is the star of Minecraft, which is ironic considering that the Creeper's effectiveness hinges upon not being seen."

The creeper image has been used on a wide variety of Minecraft merchandise, including clothing, bedding and lamps. In July 2020, a joint partnership between Mojang Studios and Kellogg's led to the announcement of Minecraft Creeper Crunch, an official Minecraft branded cereal prominently featuring a creeper on the packaging. It was set to be available for release in stores in the United States in August 2020. Every packet additionally includes a unique code which can be redeemed for a Minecraft cosmetic clothing item.

 In popular culture 

Creepers have been the subject of numerous pop culture references and parodies. In the season 25 episode "Luca$" of the animated sitcom The Simpsons, Moe Syszlak appears as a creeper and explodes at the end of the theme song's "couch gag". On August 19, 2011, Jordan Maron (aka CaptainSparklez) released the song "Revenge", a parody of "DJ Got Us Fallin' in Love", depicting a Minecraft'' player seeking revenge against creepers. The song regained popularity as an internet meme around July 2019.

References 

Fictional monsters
Minecraft
Video game antagonists
Video game characters introduced in 2009
Microsoft antagonists
Video game species and races
Internet memes
Video game mascots
Video game memes
Internet memes introduced in 2009